The Quinn Canyon Wilderness is a protected wilderness area in the Quinn Canyon Range of Nye County, in the central section of the state of Nevada in the western United States.

The nearest city is Ely, Nevada which is more than  distant by road. The wilderness was established by the United States Congress in 1989.

Description
The high point is located at 38° 07′ 20″ N and 115° 42′ 31″ W 
 
Wilderness.net described Quinn Canyon Wilderness: "Extreme isolation defines Quinn Canyon, a remote central Nevada wilderness. From the main ridgeline of the area, cresting at more than 10,000 feet, many smaller ridges and narrow canyons extend out east and west. In the Vshaped drainages, snowmelt along with summer rains collect in four year-round streams. Several springs usually provide water. From pinyon pine and juniper, the vegetation gives way to sagebrush with scattered white fir, aspen, and mahogany higher up. Small stands of bristlecone pine can be found here, too. Mule deer move into the higher elevations in summer."

A ten-mile crest of the Quinn Canyon Range is above  in elevation and is an important summer range for bighorn sheep.

Only a dirt road divides Quinn Canyon Wilderness from the larger Grant Range Wilderness to the north.

See also
 Nevada Wilderness Areas
 List of wilderness areas in Nevada
 List of U.S. Wilderness Areas
 Wilderness Act

References

External links
 official Humboldt-Toiyabe National Forest website
 National Atlas: Map of Humboldt-Toiyabe National Forest
 Friends of Nevada Wilderness

Wilderness areas of Nevada
Humboldt–Toiyabe National Forest
Protected areas of Nye County, Nevada
Protected areas established in 1989
1989 establishments in Nevada